Kris Tamulis (born December 29, 1980) is an American professional golfer.

Tamulis was born in Lapeer, Michigan. She played college golf at Florida State University where she won two events. She turned professional in 2003.

Tamulis played on the Futures Tour in 2004 and 2005, finishing in second place three times. She has played on the LPGA Tour since 2005.

Tamulis won her first LPGA Tour event at the 2015 Yokohama Tire LPGA Classic after 11 years and 186 LPGA Tour starts.

Professional wins

LPGA Tour wins (1)

References

External links

American female golfers
Florida State Seminoles women's golfers
LPGA Tour golfers
Golfers from Michigan
People from Lapeer, Michigan
Sportspeople from Metro Detroit
1980 births
Living people